Wiśniówek may refer to:

Wiśniówek, Lipsko County in Masovian Voivodeship (east-central Poland)
Wiśniówek, Ostrołęka County in Masovian Voivodeship (east-central Poland)
Wiśniówek, Podlaskie Voivodeship (north-east Poland)
Wiśniówek, Warmian-Masurian Voivodeship (north Poland)